Hans Christian Nielsen (16 February 1916 – 28 November 2004) was a Danish cyclist. He competed in the team pursuit event at the 1936 Summer Olympics.

References

External links
 

1916 births
2004 deaths
Danish male cyclists
Olympic cyclists of Denmark
Cyclists at the 1936 Summer Olympics
People from Gentofte Municipality
Sportspeople from the Capital Region of Denmark